Gerdeh Gerow (also known as Gerdeh Geravī and Gerdeh Gerdeh) is a village in Mokriyan-e Sharqi Rural District, in the Central District of Mahabad County, West Azerbaijan Province, Iran. At the 2006 census, its population was 505, in 93 families.

References 

Populated places in Mahabad County